Tourism New Zealand is the marketing agency responsible for promoting New Zealand as a tourism destination internationally. It is the trading name of the New Zealand Tourism Board, a Crown entity established under the New Zealand Tourism Board Act 1991. The  Ministry of Business, Innovation and Employment; (previously the New Zealand Ministry of Tourism) is the government department tasked with tourism policy and research.

History

New Zealand was the first country to dedicate a government department to tourism. In 1901, the Department of Tourist and Health Resorts came into being. Through most of the 20th century, its role was tactical - running hotels and putting together itineraries around New Zealand as well as advertising. The organisation now known as Tourism New Zealand focuses on marketing New Zealand.

International tourism has grown to become New Zealand's largest earner of foreign exchange, pumping around NZD14.5 billion annually into the nation's economy. Over 3.4 million visitors arrive in the country every year.

To achieve the best results Tourism New Zealand focuses marketing activity in core markets. The largest number of international visitors to New Zealand arrive from Australia, China and the USA.

In October 2017 Lonely Planet named New Zealand in the Top 10 countries to visit in 2018.

"100% Pure New Zealand"

The main marketing tool of Tourism New Zealand is the award-winning "100% Pure New Zealand" campaign, which had its ten-year anniversary in 2009.

The brand has attracted debate at times from scientists such as Mike Joy, environmentalists, and the Green Party who see the 100% Pure brand as an environmental statement.

Tourism New Zealand markets New Zealand using the 100% Pure New Zealand marketing campaign.

Social media

Tourism New Zealand set up a YouTube channel in 2007 to launch the latest iteration of its 100% Pure New Zealand campaign It has featured the theme of New Zealand being the 'Youngest Country' in the world - the last major habitable landmass to be discovered.

Tourism New Zealand also has an Instagram account. Its #NZMustDo hashtag has attracted over 500,000 images and has over 600,000 followers. All content is user generated.

See also 
Tourism in New Zealand

References

External links 
Tourism New Zealand (corporate website)
Tourism New Zealand (traveller's website)
Tourism New Zealand (international travel trade website)
Tourism New Zealand (international media website)

Tourism agencies
Tourism in New Zealand
New Zealand Crown agents